Kolebira is a village in the Kolebira CD block in the Simdega subdivision of the Simdega district in the Indian state of Jharkhand.

Geography

Location
Kolebira is located at

Area overview
In the area presented in the map alongside, “the landscape is formed of hills and undulating plateau” in the south-western part of the Chota Nagpur Plateau. About 32% of the district is covered with forests (mark the shaded portions in the map.) It is an overwhelmingly rural area with 92.83% of the population living in the rural areas.  A major portion of the rural population depends on rain-fed agriculture (average annual rainfall: 1,100-1,200 mm) for a living.

Note: The map alongside presents some of the notable locations in the district. All places marked in the map are linked in the larger full screen map.

Civic administration
There is a police station at Kolebira. 
 
The headquarters of Kolebira CD block are located at Kolebira village.

Demographics
According to the 2011 Census of India, Kolebira had a total population of 4,659, of which 2,378 (51%) were males and 2,281 (49%) were females. Population in the age range 0–6 years was 686. The total number of literate persons in Kolebira was 3,332 (83.87% of the population over 6 years.

(*For language details see Kolebira block#Language and religion)

Education
S.K.Bage College was established in 1985 at Kolebira. It offers degree courses in arts, science and commerce.

S.S. High School is a Hindi-medium coeducational institution established in 1961. It has facilities for teaching in class I to class X. The school has a playground and a library with 945 books.

Government High School Kolebira (Girls) is a Hindi-medium institution established in 1966. It has facilities for teaching in class VI to class X. The school has a library with 269 books and has 2 computers for teaching and learning purposes.

S.K.Bage Inter College Kolebira is a Hindi-medium coeducational institute established in 1972. It has facilities for teaching in classes XI and XII. It has a playground and a library with 3032 books.

Kasturba Gandhi Balika Vidyalaya is a Hindi-medium girls only institute established in 2007. It has facilities for teaching from class VI to class XII. The school has a library with 796 books and has 5 computers for teaching and learning purposes.

Children's Academy English Medium School is a coeducational institute established in 2015. It has facilities for teaching from class I to class XII. The school has a playground.

Healthcare
There is a Community Health Centre (Hospital) at Kolebira.

References

Villages in Simdega district